IHE may refer to:

 Ideal Human Environment, an Australian cult
 Insensitive High Explosive, a fire-resistant, shock-resistant high explosive
 Institute of Highway Engineers, British professional association
 Institute of Home Economics, a girls' college of Delhi University
 Integrating the Healthcare Enterprise, a non-profit organisation in the US
 UNESCO-IHE, Institute for Water Education